Zolotaya Niva ( (Golden Field) ) is a station of the Dzerzhinskaya Line of Novosibirsk Metro, Novosibirsk, Russia. It was opened on 7 October 2010. Station was closed on 26 October 2010 and then reopened on 9 February 2011.

Novosibirsk Metro stations
Railway stations in Russia opened in 2010
Dzerzhinsky City District, Novosibirsk
Railway stations located underground in Russia